Mörrum is the second largest locality situated in Karlshamn Municipality, Blekinge County, Sweden with 3,695 inhabitants in 2010.

References 

Populated places in Karlshamn Municipality